Antonio F. Saavedra (1882 – unknown) was a sailor from Cuba, who represented his country at the 1924 Summer Olympics in Le Havre, France.

References

External links

Sailors at the 1924 Summer Olympics – 6 Metre
Olympic sailors of Cuba
Cuban male sailors (sport)
1882 births
Year of death missing
Place of birth missing
Place of death missing